This is the discography of French singer-songwriter Jean-Jacques Goldman, including his work as a solo artists and as part of Taï Phong and Fredericks Goldman Jones. For his work with the charity group Les Enfoirés, with whom he recorded 26 albums, see .

Solo albums

Studio albums

Live albums

Soundtrack albums

Compilation albums

Box sets

Video albums

Collaborative albums

With Taï Phong

With Fredericks Goldman Jones

Singles

With Taï Phong

With Fredericks Goldman Jones

Charity singles

Notes

References

Discographies of French artists
Pop music discographies
Rock music discographies